692 Hippodamia, provisional designation 1901 HD, is a stony asteroid from the outer region of the asteroid belt, about 45 kilometers in diameter. It was discovered on 5 November 1901, by the German astronomers Max Wolf and August Kopff at Heidelberg Observatory in southern Germany.  Nine years later, the body was rediscovered by August Kopff at its apparition in 1910.

Description 

The S-type asteroid orbits the Sun at a distance of 2.8–4.0 AU once every 6 years and 3 months (2,272 days). Its orbit is tilted by 26 degrees to the plane of the ecliptic and shows an eccentricity of 0.17.  Based on its orbital elements, it is a member of the Cybele family. Named after the 65 Cybele, the group consists of relatively low-eccentric asteroids, which have a semi-major axis around 3.4 AU, dwelling in-between the Hungaria and the outermost Hilda family of asteroids.

According to the surveys carried out by the Infrared Astronomical Satellite, IRAS, the Japanese Akari satellite, and the Wide-field Infrared Survey Explorer with its subsequent NEOWISE mission, the body has an albedo between 0.18 and 0.20, and several independent and concurring photometric light-curve analysis rendered a well-defined rotation period of 8.99 hours.

The minor planet was named after Hippodamia, a figure from Greek mythology. It is believed the naming might have been influenced by the two letters of the provisional designation "1901 HD", a common practice of the discoverers. Hippodamia is the daughter of King Oenomaus of Pisa and wife of Pelops. She bribed Myrtilus, her father's charioteer, to remove a spoke from the royal chariot wheels so that Pelops could win her. Oenomaus had already defeated and killed 13 other suitors whom he had challenged to chariot races. After killing Oenomaus, Pelops murdered Myrtilus. These murders were primal sins, all paid for later by the many troubles of the house of Atreus.

692 Hippodamia has been observed to occult three stars, between 2020 and 2022.

References

External links 
 Asteroid Lightcurve Database (LCDB), query form (info )
 Dictionary of Minor Planet Names, Google books
 Asteroids and comets rotation curves, CdR – Observatoire de Genève, Raoul Behrend
 Discovery Circumstances: Numbered Minor Planets (1)-(5000) – Minor Planet Center
 
 

000692
Discoveries by Max Wolf
Discoveries by August Kopff
Named minor planets
000692
19011105